Kamptee taluka is a taluka of Nagpur district in Maharashtra state, India.  It covers an area of 40,700 hectare, and as of 2001 had a population of 209,003,  126,097 of whom were urban dwellers, and 82,906 were rural. The administrative center of the taluka is the city of Kamptee. It is also a part of Nagpur metropolitan region.

Panchayat villages
Kamptee taluka is divided into forty-eight panchayat villages, each of which oversees one or more villages. The panchayat villages are:

Notes

External links
 

Talukas in Maharashtra